Rengoni is an Assamese language general entertainment television channel owned by A M Television Pvt. Ltd. of Guwahati, Assam. This channel was launched on 3 June 2013. This channel provides various differentiated programs. The Rengoni TV is available without any subscription, mostly on all the DTH/ Cable TV platforms. It is a free-to-air TV channel.

Currently broadcast

Comedy series

Serials

Formerly broadcast

Comedy series

Bhola Bhai MBBS
Centu Da
Cut to Cut
Khepo Mama
Khisiri
Premananda
Netro Kair Sansar

Drama series

Aaina
Aparupa
Astitwa
Chandrawali
Epahi Sukh Epahi Dukh
Karna : Anya Ek Maharathi
Ki Naam Di Matim
Kun Mur Apun
Moromor Anuradha
Pratichobi
Urania Mon
Yeh Dosti
4 idiots

Reality Show
Art Axom Art
Club 8
Dance Assam Dance
Family No.1
Grihini Superstar Season 1
Grihini Superstar Season 2
Junior Super Dancer
Just Dance
Jugalbandi
Moi Zubeen Garg Hobo Bisaru

North East Got Talent Season 1
North East Got Talent Season 2
North East Got Talent Season 3
Rupohi  : The Makeover Show

Thriller

Others
Mukuta Mukuta Gaan
Swargam mix masala

See also
 List of longest-running Indian television series
 List of Assamese-language television channels

References

Indian direct broadcast satellite services
Television stations in Guwahati
24-hour television news channels in India
Assamese-language television channels
Television channels and stations established in 2000